Taylor Square Substation No.6 and Underground Conveniences is a heritage-listed electrical substation and underground public toilets at the intersection of Taylor Square, Oxford, Forbes and Bourke Streets, in the inner city Sydney suburb of Darlinghurst in the City of Sydney local government area of New South Wales, Australia. Both the substation and the underground conveniences were designed by Robert Hargreave Brodrick and built from 1904 to 1907, with Owen Ridge & Sons building the substation and G. D. Getherson the underground public conveniences. The property is owned by City of Sydney. It was added to the New South Wales State Heritage Register on 2 July 2004.

History 

With its elevated position over the city, the Darlinghurst area has been called Woolloomooloo Heights, Eastern Hill and Henrietta Town. In the 1820s, Governor Ralph Darling renamed the suburb in honour of his wife, Eliza Darling.

By 1800 several large windmills were situated on the heights of this area, using its stiff breezes to grind much-needed flour from grain. The area began its suburban life under the name "Henrietta Town", being called after Elizabeth Macquarie, whose second name was Henrietta. At that time it was an Aboriginal reserve. Loyalties changed with Governors when Darling took office, changing its name to Darlinghurst in honour of his popular wife. "Hurst" is an old English word for a wooded hill.

By the late 1830s Darlinghurst had become a densely populated residential suburb lined with rows of small terraces and grand houses.

The gilt went off the suburb when Darlinghurst Gaol, designed by Colonial Architect Mortimer Lewis was built in 1841. It was not its style, but the significance of its erection that was the reason for the decline in Darlinghurst's popularity. Governor Brisbane had reserved 3.5 acres on Sydney's outskirts for a new gaol to replace the earlier lock-up in George Street. In 1823 a stockade was erected. Convicts quarried the stone from nearby William Street and hauled it to the hill top, where other convict gangs shaped up the blocks by hand. The completed enclosure was known as Woolloomooloo Stockade. Construction commenced in 1836 and was complete by 1841. Prisoners from George Street prison were marched in chains to Darlinghurst to the jeers and catcalls of the watching crowd. The first public hanging took place at the new gaol on 29 October 1841. Darlinghurst Courthouse, neighbouring the gaol, was constructed in the 1840s, with later additions by the 1880s. By this time the area now known as Taylor Square had become a busy transport interchange for bus and steam tram services.

In 1883 a public urinal occupied the site at Taylor Square. In 1885 a steel structure was erected over the urinals to provide a platform for the elevated saltwater tanks. It is believed that these saltwater tanks were used for street cleaning. This early technique of public sanitation provided the rudimentary predecessor to the purpose-designed Underground Conveniences.

On 16 October 1896 the Municipal Council of Sydney Electric Lighting Bill was passed by the Parliament of New South Wales, establishing the right for Sydney Municipal Council to light the streets and to generate and supply electricity to the residents of the City of Sydney.

The construction of Electricity Substation No. 6 was completed in 1904. It is the most intact of the first five substations built by Sydney Municipal Council that brought electricity to the streets, homes and businesses of Sydney city for the first time. At 5pm on 8 July 1904 the Municipal Council of Sydney's Electricity Undertaking switched on their supply system and the city streets from Circular Quay to Redfern and from Hyde Park to Darling Harbour were lit by electric lights for the first time. Electricity quickly became an exciting new commodity which the Council's Electricity Undertaking were trying to sell to both the local councils and private customers. In continuous operation from 1904 to 1993, the Substation building marks the commencement of the major technological transformation of the twentieth century associated with the development of the modern city and state.

In response to the public health and safety concerns, particularly after the outbreak of the bubonic plague in Sydney in 1900, Sydney Municipal Council undertook to build one underground men's convenience a year from 1901 to 1911. The Underground Men's Conveniences at Taylor Square was erected in 1907, replacing the public urinals and saltwater tank, and was the sixth of the underground conveniences to be constructed in Sydney.

Together, the construction of these purpose-designed, high quality, Civic buildings within the public domain formed part of the introduction of the City Beautiful movement into Sydney that drove the complete remodelling of Oxford Street and associated creation of Taylor Square in 1907. The public space, Civic buildings and streets were remodelled to provide for the introduction of the State's first electric tram and to improve city design and traffic movement throughout Victorian Sydney. While the Substation provided the electricity for the newly introduced electric tram, the conveniences serviced the large volume of tram commuters. The City Beautiful movement was evident throughout Sydney with the construction of a total of twelve ft these purpose-designed Public Underground Conveniences located in the public domain of the City, often associated with the tram lines, of which the Taylor Square Conveniences remain the only extant example.

In 1938 after years of debate on a "suitable" location for equivalent female conveniences and in response to active petitioning from the Women's Progressive Association, Council modified the southern end of the existing Substation to accommodate women's conveniences. These were the first public toilets provided for women at Taylor Square, some 55 years after the first male public urinal was provided at Taylor Square. Council policy was that women's conveniences "should, when possible, form part of a block of buildings. If it is only possible to have them in independent structures then they should be combined with a small shop such as a florist, tearooms, Parcels Office etc." The allocation of a Public Ladies' Convenience in this town square, and the manner and timeframe in which this was achieved, symbolises the evolution in social attitudes to the public role of women, as well as the growing activism of feminist groups in Sydney during the early 20th Century. The first female public conveniences in Sydney were provided in 1910 at Hyde Park, then at Railway Square and Circular Quay. The survival of these other early examples has not been established.

The conveniences were closed to public access in 1988 and the substation decommissioned in 1993.

Description

Substation No. 6
The Substation has a rectangular plan and is constructed in load bearing face brick with rusticated sandstone lintels, arches and base coursing, and is dressed with sandstone top coursing, window sills, and window heads. Brickwork string coursing and corbels are featured near the parapet, which steps up towards the southern end. The parapet features a bullnose course, projecting course and brick end capping. The external brickwork reveals the former outline of the 1904 sandstone buttresses and freestone copings. The 1928 parapet line is also evident. The 1938 Art Deco southern wall to the stair to the women's conveniences remains.

The floor level of the Substation is located below the pavement level and is accessed via a street stair from Bourke Street. The landing is edged in decorative steel. Access to an internal mezzanine platform is also available from the pavement level on the eastern side of the substation via a single leaf door.

The western and eastern elevations have two groups of three timber arched windows symmetrically placed about central doors. To the north, the three separate openings, of similar arched shape, contain painted steel horizontal louvres behind fixed metal screens. To the south the windows, which originally mirrored the north, have been bricked up and the central window replaced with a door opening for the women's conveniences. The steel rainwater heads and downpipes from the 1928 alterations and additions have been retained, as has the 1938 "Ladies" signs.

Internally, the ground floor of the Substation is free of internal partitions. The upper level floor and walls are supported on steel beams situated above the substation wall. The ground floor is concrete with trenches running along the eastern, western and southern walls with metal cover plates. The walls are rendered and painted brickwork. The piers still exist on the western wall.

Underground Men's Conveniences
The Edwardian style Underground Men's Conveniences are characterised externally by a wrought iron fence and gates, with Art Nouveau detailing that are set on a painted sandstone base, and a central masonry podium (the air vent) located at the centre of the curved stairs, which originally supported a decorative metal vent capping. The Conveniences are accessed from pavement level via two separate interlocking curved staircases that encircle a central vent. Two masonry piers flank the two entry gates to the staircases.

Internally, the main subterranean structure is enclosed in a brickwork cavity with a curved concrete ceiling supported by exposed steel beams. The symmetrical plan of the underground conveniences is arranged around the circular core containing the pair of interlocking curved stairs and air vent, and comprises five toilet cubicles and two ceramic urinal stalls. An attendant's room is located under the stairs and air vent, and features a low arched entrance and original arched timber door with multi paned glazing. The internal walls of the conveniences feature white florite glass tiles and ceramic tiles frieze with art Nouveau green floral patterns at a high level, which have been painted. Much of the original joinery, including timber framed doors, timber framed louvres and moulded timber architraves, has survived.

Modern services, including fluorescent lights, electrical cabling and mechanical ventilation ducts have also been introduced to the internal space.

Women's Conveniences

The women's conveniences are located at the southern end at the first floor level. Much of the original partitioning, joinery and sanitary fixtures have been retained. The toilets remain in the cubicles along the western wall with wash basins located along the northern wall. The entrance is lined with cream square ceramic tiles, the floor covered in linoleum with red skirting. The wired glass skylights are patterned with metal ventilation grilles to the ceiling.

Condition 

As at 27 November 2003:

The Conveniences were in good structural condition. However, there has been leaking though the roof which requires a new membrane. The steel beams supporting the roof show signs of rusting which should be cleaned of paint and rust and structural adequacy assessed prior to recoating the beams. Some tiling has been damaged.

The Substation were generally in good structural condition except for the two end gable parapets which have substantial cracking that requires attention.

Additional research and investigation is required to gauge the archaeological potential of the site. There is a high level of original integrity of both structures.

Modifications and dates 
 1904: Electrical Substation No.6 constructed (originally known as Substation No.1).
 1905: Temporary staircase of Substation replaced with permanent iron staircase.
 1907: Underground (male) Public Conveniences constructed.
 1928/1938: Saltwater tanks removed prior to this time. Alterations included the removal of the buttresses, raising of the roof, removal of sandstone coping and straightening of the brick parapet.
 1938: Ladies Conveniences constructed within substation building, built by Mr S Featherstone, costing 493 pounds.
 1940: Alterations to the Underground Conveniences, including replacement of two existing banks of urinal stalls, installation of bakelite seats in water closets, repairs to iron gates, and improvements to lighting at entrances.
 1961: Further minor renovations and alterations to Underground Conveniences.
 1988: Underground Conveniences closed to the public.
 1993: Substation decommissioned.
 2001: Art exhibition installed in Underground Conveniences known as "Inverted Belvedere" (from 15/9/2001 - 6/10/2001) causing some damage to internal finishes.

Heritage listing 
The Underground Public Conveniences and Substation No. 6 are a rare and distinctive group of public utilities from early-twentieth century Sydney. They are of State heritage significance within the aesthetic, historic, associations, technical, social, representative and rarity criteria, as a group and individually.

The Taylor Square group contains the oldest, surviving underground public toilet in Sydney (built in 1907), and the most intact of the first Electric Substations of New South Wales (built in 1904) that first brought sanitation reform and electricity to the public streets of Sydney City and New South Wales. As the oldest extant examples in Sydney, they a rare and lasting record of the major reforms and achievements of the early 20th Century in sanitation, public health, technology and City design, which transformed Sydney and the other city centres of Australia into modern cities. The only other known examples of purpose-designed public underground toilets in Australia from this era of public health reform are located in the inner city of Melbourne and have been identified as nationally significant.

Both buildings are fine examples of Edwardian Civic architecture, designed by the prominent City Surveyor and Architect, Robert Hargreave Brodrick, and are landmarks of Taylor Square. Together, these fine Civic buildings have formed part of the identity of Taylor Square since its creation in the early 1900s, and are associated with the State's first electric tram service that once ran through this intersection, a key tram junction at the time. The quality, design and function of these buildings also represents the introduction of the City Beautiful movement into Sydney during the early 20th Century, a movement that drove the complete remodelling of this town square and Oxford Street to improve urban design and traffic movement within Sydney.

These Taylor Square buildings have provided the constant setting to developments of national significance in Australian society, as the symbolic birthplace and growth of gay pride activism in Australia since the first gay pride march commenced at Taylor Square in 1978, and as a continuing focus of the annual Mardi Gras, an internationally recognised event. The group also contains the first public female toilet of Taylor Square, built in 1938 within the Substation building, demonstrating the growing activism of feminist groups in Sydney and the changing public role of women during the early 20th Century.

Taylor Square Substation No.6 was listed on the New South Wales State Heritage Register on 2 July 2004 having satisfied the following criteria.

The place is important in demonstrating the course, or pattern, of cultural or natural history in New South Wales.

The Underground Public Conveniences and Substation No. 6 are significant as a rare and distinctive group of public utilities established in the inner City of early-twentieth century Sydney. As a group, the Underground Public Conveniences and Substation No. 6 provide a rare and lasting record of the major reforms and achievements of the early 20th Century in sanitation, public health, technology and City design, which transformed Sydney and the other city centres of Australia into modern cities.

The buildings are remnant evidence of the introduction of the State's first electric tram that once ran through this intersection, and the major tram junction at Taylor Square, as the construction of the substation and conveniences was associated with servicing the new electric tram lines and commuters. The isolated location of the buildings within the original roadway (formerly alongside the tram lines), their function, quality, scale and age provide evidence of these former tram lines and junction, and their important role at the time as a major form of transportation.

The provision of purpose-designed underground toilets in the public domain to replace the former public urinal in this location, demonstrates the changing importance of public health and sanitation during this era, in response to the public health crisis in Sydney from the outbreak of bubonic plague in 1900.

Built in 1907, the Underground Public Conveniences are the oldest extant underground toilets in Sydney, of which there were originally twelve. They are also possibly the oldest extant public toilets in Sydney.

Electricity Substation No. 6, constructed in 1904, is one of the first five substations built by Sydney Municipal Council that brought electricity to the streets, homes and businesses of Sydney city for the first time in 1904. It is the most intact of the two surviving examples of these first substations. In continuous operation from 1904 to 1993, the building marks the commencement of the major technological transformation of the twentieth century associated with the development of the modern city and state.

The Substation also contains the first Public Ladies Conveniences allocated in Taylor Square, built in 1938, 55 years after the first male public urinal was allocated in Taylor Square, largely due to the petitions of the early feminist group, the Women's Progressive Association. The allocation of a Public Ladies' Convenience in this town square, and the manner and timeframe in which this was achieved, symbolises the evolution in social attitudes to the public role of women, as well as the growing activism of feminist groups in Sydney during the early 20th Century.

The place has a strong or special association with a person, or group of persons, of importance of cultural or natural history of New South Wales's history.

The Substation and Underground Conveniences have provided the constant setting to nationally significant developments in Australian society, as the birthplace and development of gay pride activism in Australia since the first gay pride march commenced at Taylor Square in 1978. This important association of the place with the gay and lesbian community has continued, as it remains a focus of the annual Mardi Gras, a highly popular and internationally recognised event. The place has a well-established profile for this association not only in Australia but internationally.

The place is important in demonstrating aesthetic characteristics and/or a high degree of creative or technical achievement in New South Wales.

Electricity Substation No. 6 and the Underground Conveniences have been landmarks of Taylor Square since its formation in the early Twentieth Century, identifying one of Sydney City's defining public spaces, major thoroughfares and processional route into and out of the City.

The buildings are fine examples of Edwardian Civic architecture, with Interwar Art Deco overlays, both originally designed by the prominent City Surveyor and Architect, Robert Hargreave Brodrick. The quality and design of the buildings represent the introduction of the ideals of the City Beautiful movement into Sydney to improve City design and traffic movement at the time, which drove the complete remodelling of Oxford Street and creation of Taylor Square in 1907.

Together, the buildings contribute to one of the most intact Victorian and Edwardian streetscapes in Sydney, and reinforce the Civic precinct on the northern side of Taylor Square relating to the significant Darlinghurst Courthouse and the Sydney Municipal Council buildings along Oxford Street (1907–16).

The place has a strong or special association with a particular community or cultural group in New South Wales for social, cultural or spiritual reasons.

The two Civic buildings mark the town square that holds important associations with the gay and lesbian community, as the centre for the recognised homosexual community since the 1960s, and as the birthplace and development of gay pride activism in Australia. Taylor Square provided the starting point of the first gay pride march in 1978, formed the focus of subsequent rallies, demonstrations and confrontations with Police, and continues to play an important role in the annual Mardi Gras, a highly popular and internationally recognised event.

The substation and underground conveniences are socially significant as a community meeting place of Taylor Square and Oxford Street, and are important to the community's sense of place.

The place has potential to yield information that will contribute to an understanding of the cultural or natural history of New South Wales.

Substation No. 6 retains its ability to demonstrate its original use and design intent and has considerable potential to yield information about the earliest operation of electrical services and provision of electrical supply to Sydney.

Evidence of the earlier salt water tanks that were originally located on the site above the substation are also retained, which provide information on the early techniques of street cleaning, sanitation and public health. These tanks provided the rudimentary predecessor to the Underground Public Conveniences where the salt water was used for street cleaning over the 1883 public urinal.

The underground toilets, replacing the former public urinal and salt water tanks, demonstrate the advancements in sanitation technology in the public domain of Sydney during the early 20th century, as a result the public health crisis of the outbreak of the Bubonic Plague in 1900.

The place possesses uncommon, rare or endangered aspects of the cultural or natural history of New South Wales.

The Underground Public Conveniences are rare in Australia as the oldest extant underground toilets in Sydney. The other known examples of public underground toilets from the same era of public health reform are in the inner-City of Melbourne and have been assessed as nationally significant.

The Underground Public Conveniences are rare in the State as the only surviving example of the first group of public underground toilets in the inner-City of Sydney (of which there were originally twelve). Of this first group, the Taylor Square toilet was also the only one to feature interlocking curved staircases.

Substation No. 6 is rare in the State as the most intact of the first substations constructed in the State, and which was in continuous operation from 1904 to 1993.

Together, these rare early examples of Civic utilities provide evidence of the major technological achievements of the early 20th century that transformed Australia's city centres into modern cities.

The place is important in demonstrating the principal characteristics of a class of cultural or natural places/environments in New South Wales.

The group of buildings at Taylor Square represent fine examples of Edwardian Civic architecture, which together demonstrate the City Beautiful movement to improve urban design of the public domain and traffic movement that transformed parts of Sydney during the early 20th Century.

As the oldest most-intact examples of their type, the buildings also demonstrate the major technological achievements and reforms of the early 20th Century in sanitation, public health and power supply that transformed Sydney into a modern City.

The buildings are landmarks of the Taylor Square precinct that is and has been held in high esteem by the homosexual community since the 1960s, representing the centre of the recognised gay community since this time, representing the birthplace of gay pride activism in Australia in 1978, and the development of these origins into the internationally recognised and highly popular Mardi Gras.

See also

References

Bibliography

Attribution 

New South Wales State Heritage Register
Darlinghurst, New South Wales
Electric power infrastructure in New South Wales
Energy infrastructure completed in 1906
Articles incorporating text from the New South Wales State Heritage Register
Public toilets in Australia
1906 establishments in Australia